The Women's duet event at the 2012 Summer Olympics in London, United Kingdom, took place at the Aquatics Centre from 5 to 7 August.

The preliminary phase consisted of a technical routine and a free routine. The scores from the two routines were added together and the top 12 duets qualified for the final.

The final consisted of one free routine, the score from the final free routine was added to the score from the preliminary technical routine to decide the overall winners.

Schedule 
All times are UTC+1

Results

Qualification

Final

References

2012
2012 in women's sport
Women's events at the 2012 Summer Olympics